The Kawasaki W650 is a retro standard motorcycle marketed by Kawasaki for model years 1999-2007 and superseded by the Kawasaki W800.

The "W" in "W650" refers to Kawasaki's W1, W2 and W3 models, manufactured between 1967 and 1975. The "650" refers to the engine displacement.

In 1999, superseding the Zephyr series, Kawasaki introduced the W650, resembling British motorcycles of the early 1960s, notably the Triumph Bonneville.  The engines of the British motorcycles used pushrods, but the W650 has an overhead camshaft, driven by bevel gears, in the same way as 1970s Ducati singles and V-twins. The W650 had no connection to Triumphs. They directly descended, with modifications, from the BSA 650.

The W650 has a long-stroke engine of 72 mm bore x 80 mm stroke with an anti-vibration balance shaft and modern electronics. In 2006 Kawasaki added a short-stroke W400 model, in Japan. Kawasaki simply combined the same 72 mm bore with a short-throw crankshaft to give a 49 mm stroke and   displacement.

In the United States and Canada, the W650 was imported for model years 2000-2001. With weak US and Canadian sales and the introduction of the competing "retro" Bonneville by Triumph, Kawasaki concentrated sales in Europe and Japan.

Production of the W400 and W650, unable to meet new emissions standards, ended in 2008.

References

External links 

 Motorcycle Online: First Ride
 Motorcyclist Online: Kawasaki W650 and Triumph Bonneville
 Motorcycle Cruiser (October, 2000)

W650
Standard motorcycles
Motorcycles introduced in 1999